The  is an automobile manufactured and marketed by Nissan from 1981 to 2004. Considered a mini MPV or a compact MPV. It was also marketed as the Multi in Canada and the Stanza Wagon in the United States. In Japan, it was exclusive to Nissan Bluebird Store locations, then later at Nissan Blue Stage sales channels. The Prairie had a very flexible seating capability and sliding rear doors on both sides of the vehicle, with a liftgate in the back. The name "prairie" was derived from French which means an extensive area of relatively flat grassland, similar to "steppe" or "savanna".

The second generation was marketed as the Nissan Axxess in North America, and replaced there by the larger Nissan/Ford joint venture called the Nissan Quest, and in Europe it was partially replaced by the Nissan Serena.

When the third generation of this vehicle was introduced in Japan, it was renamed initially Prairie Liberty, with the "Prairie" name eventually dropped in November 1998. This vehicle was replaced with the Nissan Lafesta in 2004.

First generation (M10; 1982)

The Nissan Prairie, known in Canada as the Multi and the United States as the Stanza Wagon, was equipped with a four-cylinder engine, with either a manual or automatic transmission. Available with front wheel drive or optional four wheel drive, the vehicle had rear passenger sliding doors on both sides of the vehicle, and a folding rear seat, designed to increase the carrying capacity of the passenger compartment. The rear tailgate opened upwards as one complete unit, in a similar fashion to a hatchback or station wagon. The Prairie competed with the Toyota Sprinter Carib with a similar wagon approach, Mitsubishi Chariot, and the Honda Shuttle.

The Prairie resembled a tall station wagon / estate with the addition of sliding side doors. It was available with five seats, though seven and eight were also available in some markets. It was developed from the Nissan Sunny platform, while using the powertrain from the Nissan Stanza. It was a companion  model to the more traditional cabover Nissan Vanette, offering buyers a choice of appearance and flexibility. The trailing arm torsion beam rear suspension was borrowed from the Pulsar Van (VN10; sold as the Cherry Wagon in Europe). Some reviewers commented that when driven hard, undesirable body characteristics were exhibited, possibly due to the combination of missing B-pillar and torsion beam rear suspension. Strong understeering characteristics were also typical.

The Prairie design was strongly inspired by the Lancia Megagamma concept by Giorgetto Giugiaro and ItalDesign, shown in 1979, and offered Japanese buyers a spacious, flexible passenger/cargo arrangement that complied with Japanese Government dimension regulations and used small displacement engines that offered Japanese buyers options with regards to annual road tax obligations.

The first generation Prairies were innovative vehicles - featuring no B-pillar between the front and rear doors (instead the interlocking front and sliding rear doors locked onto both the floor and roof of the vehicle); front seatbelts mounted on the doors (excluding the US versions) that facilitated a totally unimpeded side entrance; front seats that could be slid all the way to the front of the passenger compartment and fully reclined; rear seats that could not only be folded away conventionally, but could also be reclined fully to make a double bed (in combination with the front seats); rear window winders that folded into themselves (to prevent catching when the doors were slid open); tailgate that opened past the floor of the very low and flat luggage compartment (the center section of the rear bumper was mounted on the tailgate); optional front-facing third row of seats. This type of entry was later introduced on the Toyota Isis, but only on the passenger side.

It was originally launched in Japan with a 1.5- or 1.8-litre Inline-four engine mated to a five-speed gearbox. Another notable addition to the Japanese market's models was an optional column shifted manual. A four-wheel drive version followed later in the car's life. An extensive accessories and options list was available in the Japanese Domestic Market, including a kit that effectively turned the vehicle into a campervan. In January 1985 a facelifted version was introduced, with slightly modified engines. These later cars received a new grille treatment and an entirely redesigned rear end: the bumper was now mounted separately to provide more stability after earlier versions had come under criticism for being much too flexible. This redesign also included taller, flush-fit rear side windows. In September 1985 the 4WD model finally appeared, using a larger 2-litre engine and the rear axle from the Nissan Sunny 4WD (B12). A 4WD model had been planned from the beginning, but the original bodyshell's lack of rigidity made Nissan rethink the concept.

The vehicle was launched as the Datsun Prairie in Europe and was rebranded to Nissan along with the rest of the range from 1984, at first featuring "Datsun by Nissan" badging and then solely "Nissan" badging from 1985. However, as Prairie was a slow but steady seller, some instrument clusters remained with the Datsun script featuring on the centre of the speedometer. Nissan tried, with partial success, to cover over the script a grey sticker over the plastic fascia of the instruments, rather than on the speedometer itself. The 1.5-litre engine was dropped from the UK market sometime after the 1986 facelift with the 1.8 becoming the sole engine offered. From the facelift (larger front lights, larger front indicators with additional side repeat indicators, trim improvements, redesigned rear tail light clusters) onwards the UK model was available either in 1.5 GL, 1.8 SGL or 1.8 SGL Anniversary II specification (featuring two-tone paint, electric front windows, electric steel sliding sunroof, power assisted steering and a dealer applied 'Anniversary II' badge on the tailgate). The Prairie was sold with a 3-year 100,000 mile warranty and a 6-year anti-corrosion warranty.

The European 1.5 produces , while the later 2.0 offered . Four-wheel-drive was introduced along with the larger engine.

Second generation (M11; 1988)

The second generation of the Prairie was introduced September 1988 and marketed as the Axxess in North America. To meet concerns that the original bodyshell was too weak, the platform used was upgraded from the smaller Nissan Sunny to the larger Nissan Bluebird. The engines were correspondingly bigger as well. The second generation Prairie lost some of the innovative features that made the first generation standout - the B-pillar was reinstated, the torsion beam rear suspension was replaced with a more conventional coil setup which prevented the rear seats from reclining. The vehicle sold for six years (1990–95) in Canada, but only from 1990-1992 in the United States as it was replaced by the Nissan Quest. The U.S. version had motorized automatic seatbelts while the Canadian versions had manual belts.

North American models only offered the larger 2.4-litre engine. The Prairie came with optional AWD and a 2.0 litre engine. In Europe, the Prairie was later replaced with the taller, more van-like Nissan Serena, while the Nissan Quest replaced both the Axxess and the Nissan Van in North America.

Nissan Prairie Joy
In Japan, Nissan stretched the rear of the vehicle to better accommodate third seat passengers and load carrying, calling the vehicle the Prairie Joy and offering the vehicle in August 1995. Conversions offered a raised roof over the passenger space up to the rear hatch. As of May 1997, anti-lock brakes and driver and front passenger airbags were offered, along with ultraviolet restricting tinted glass.

Third generation (M12; 1998)

For this generation, the car's name was changed to Nissan Liberty in Japan, while in Hong Kong, it retained the Prairie name. It has rear sliding doors and was available with either front-wheel drive or all-wheel drive. It is equipped with either the SR20DE or the SR20DET engine, both of which are mated to either a 4-speed automatic or a CVT transmission.

The third generation Prairie now shared a platform with the compact station wagon Nissan Avenir with the Prairie/Liberty focused more on flexible seating and cargo carrying duties.

Some of the issues buyers had with the Prairie was its appearance and performance, so the styling was given more attention, and Nissan's Autech division punched up its performance image, by offering the Liberty Rider that replaced the Axis trim package. The turbocharged engine was offered in the "Highway Star 4WD" package October 12, 1999, as well as the "Highway Star GT4", also enhanced by Autech. Front wheel drive vehicles were only available with the CVT transmission. Styling and luxury items offered on the larger Nissan Elgrand were also offered on the Liberty.

The Liberty saw competition from Toyota and Honda during this generation from the Toyota Ipsum, Mitsubishi Chariot, and the Honda Stream, and was joined with the new, larger Nissan Presage at Nissan Bluebird Store locations.

From June 19, 2001, Nissan offered a rear door that swung up electrically, with a platform that extended out for passengers that used a wheelchair, and by remote control. The sliding doors were offered with an electrically opening feature on both sides from May 7, 2001. A facelift appeared in September 2002 and various appearance packages were offered to update the appearance until sales ended in December 2004, and replaced by the all new Nissan Lafesta.

See also 
 Lancia Megagamma
 Mitsubishi Chariot

References

 Archives Catalog WEB Liberty (M12-period)
 WEB Liberty Archives Catalog (M12-medium term)
 Archives Catalog WEB Liberty (M12-late)
 Liberty / CM PRAIRIELIBERTY information

Prairie
All-wheel-drive vehicles
Front-wheel-drive vehicles
Minivans
Compact MPVs
Vehicles with CVT transmission
Cars introduced in 1982
1990s cars
2000s cars
Cars discontinued in 2004